James Ray Thrash (born April 28, 1975) is a former American football wide receiver. He was signed by the Philadelphia Eagles as an undrafted free agent in 1997. He played college football at Missouri Southern State University.

Thrash also played for the Washington Redskins.  He currently works on the Redskins' player development staff.

Early years
Thrash graduated from Wewoka High School in Wewoka, Oklahoma.

Professional career
Thrash was signed as an undrafted free agent out of Missouri Southern State University by the Philadelphia Eagles in 1997, but was quickly released and signed by the Washington Redskins during training camp.

Thrash played for four seasons with the Redskins before signing with the Eagles again. After three seasons with the Eagles, including two as their leading wide receiver, the Redskins traded a 5th round draft pick in 2005 to the Eagles to bring him back to Washington. The pick later became defensive end Trent Cole.

The Redskins released Thrash on June 12, 2009 after he failed his physical due to a neck injury.

After retirement
Since retiring from the NFL, Thrash has worked on Christian evangelism, and has spoken at numerous churches. He is also a coach for the NVHAA Centurions in Manassas, Virginia.  Most recently Thrash has joined the No More Organization to combat domestic violence and sexual assault. James Thrash has been appointed as an appeals officer by the NFL since 2015.

References

1975 births
Living people
Players of American football from Colorado
Players of American football from Oklahoma
American football wide receivers
Missouri Southern Lions football players
Philadelphia Eagles players
Washington Redskins players
People from Wewoka, Oklahoma
Ed Block Courage Award recipients